Spring Valley Colony is a Hutterite colony and census-designated place (CDP) in Jerauld County, South Dakota, United States. It was first listed as a CDP prior to the 2020 census.

It is in the western part of the county, on the north side of a west-flowing tributary of Crow Creek, which in turn flows west to the Missouri River at Lake Francis Case.

Demographics

References 

Census-designated places in Jerauld County, South Dakota
Census-designated places in South Dakota
Hutterite communities in the United States